Matejko is a Polish surname. Notable people with the surname include:

 Helena née Matejko, daughter of Jan and Teodora Matejko
 Jan Matejko (1838–1893),  Polish painter 
 Teodora Matejko, wife of Jan Matejko
 Franciszek Ksawery Matejko, Czech-Polish musician, father of Jan Matejko

Polish-language surnames